In the Vortex is a novel by Alexey Pisemsky written in 1870 and first published in Beseda magazine's Nos. 1-6, 1871, issues. Initially dismissed by critics of the democratic camp as just another 'anti-nihilist' novel (alongside  Daniil Mordovtsev's Sign of the Times and Nikolai Bazhin's The History of One Community, both 1869) aimed at discrediting the revolutionary movement, later it came to be recognized as one of Pisemsky's most sophisticated works.

Lev Tolstoy praised In the Vortex for its compositional intricacy, while Nikolai Leskov considered it to be the best of Pisemsky's novels.

References

External links
В водовороте. The original Russian text

1870 Russian novels
Novels by Aleksey Pisemsky
Novels set in 19th-century Russia